Hidayapuram 1 Grama Niladhari Division is a Grama Niladhari Division of the Pothuvil Divisional Secretariat of Ampara District of Eastern Province, Sri Lanka. It has Grama Niladhari Division Code P/20.

Hidayapuram 1 is a surrounded by the Kanagarkiramam, Hidayapuram 2, Rasak Moulana Nagar and Hijra Nagar Grama Niladhari Divisions.

Demographics

Ethnicity 
The Hidayapuram 1 Grama Niladhari Division has a Moor majority (99.4%). In comparison, the Pothuvil Divisional Secretariat (which contains the Hidayapuram 1 Grama Niladhari Division) has a Moor majority (78.2%) and a significant Sri Lankan Tamil population (18.8%)

Religion 
The Hidayapuram 1 Grama Niladhari Division has a Muslim majority (99.4%). In comparison, the Pothuvil Divisional Secretariat (which contains the Hidayapuram 1 Grama Niladhari Division) has a Muslim majority (78.2%) and a significant Hindu population (15.5%)

References 

Grama Niladhari Divisions of Pothuvil Divisional Secretariat